The 2006 United States House elections in Pennsylvania was an election for Pennsylvania's delegation to the United States House of Representatives, which occurred as part of the general election of the House of Representatives on November 7, 2006.

General election

Overview

1st Congressional district

2nd Congressional District

3rd Congressional district

4th Congressional district

5th Congressional district

6th Congressional district
In the Pennsylvania 6th congressional district election, incumbent Republican Jim Gerlach defeated Democratic opponent Lois Murphy by a 50.7%–49.3% margin to secure a third term. This was a rematch of the 2004 election, when Gerlach defeated Murphy by a similarly close margin. In the primary election, Gerlach was unopposed and Lois Murphy defeated developer Mike Leibowitz.

The race was one of the most competitive in the nation, with CQPolitics.comrating the race as highly competitive with "No Clear Favorite." The Cook Political Report rated the race "Republican Toss Up" and Larry Sabato's Crystal Ball rated this as one of the top fifty most competitive House races in the nation, and was the first one he predicted a turnover in. The candidates participated in two debates in October. The first, sponsored by the AARP focused on Social Security, healthcare, Iraq, and taxes. The second debate, airing on WPVI, focused on Iraq. Murphy outspent Gerlach by a margin of $4,097,663 to $3,492,402.

7th Congressional district
In the Pennsylvania 7th congressional district election, long-time incumbent Republican Curt Weldon was defeated by retired Navy 3-star admiral Joe Sestak.

Prior to the primary election, Iraq war veteran Bryan Lentz agreed to drop his bid for the seat held by Weldon, instead running for a Pennsylvania state legislature seat, a move brokered by Governor Ed Rendell. Lentz had raised about $125,000 for his congressional campaign. Haverford Democrat Paul Scoles, who ran poorly funded race against Weldon in 2004, also backed out in early February, throwing his support behind Sestak.

, covering the suburbs west of Philadelphia, was one of the districts where John Kerry outpolled Bush in the 2004 election, which nonetheless elected a Republican to the House. As such, it became the target of Democratic strategists; in 2006 the Democrats fielded a much stronger and vastly better-funded challenger. On October 13, the media reported that Weldon and his daughter were being investigated by the FBI for their involvement with two Russian energy companies and a Serbian company connected with Slobodan Milosevic. The investigation focuses on the lobbying firm Solutions North America owned and run by daughter Karen Weldon and local Republican operative Charlie Sexton, which was hired for $1 million, and whether Weldon was involved in obtaining the contracts or was lobbied by his daughter's firm. Three days later, FBI agents raided the home of Weldon's daughter, Karen, as well as five other locations of Weldon associates in Pennsylvania and Florida as part of the investigation. On October 17, 2006, The Philadelphia Inquirer reported that Weldon "acknowledged yesterday that he was under investigation."

On October 13, 2006, CQPolitics changed their rating on the race, from "Leans Republican" to the highly competitive "No Clear Favorite." This was the second time CQPolitics changed its rating in the match-up; in July, it reclassified the race from "Republican Favored" to the more competitive "Leans Republican." They subsequently noted, however, that this change was made the day before the media reported that the FBI was investigating Weldon and his daughter. Shortly after the raid, CQPolitics.com changed their rating on this race for a third time, this time from "No Clear Favorite" to "Leans Democratic". On October 6, 2006, the non-partisan Cook Political Report re-rated the race from "Lean Republican" to the more competitive "Toss Up." Larry Sabato's Crystal Ball, in late June, rated as one of the top thirty most competitive House races in the nation. Sabato has said that "Weldon has deep roots in this district, but his persistence on the issue of finding weapons of mass destruction in Iraq has struck more than several observers as unusual."

8th Congressional district

9th Congressional district

10th Congressional district
Republican four-term incumbent Don Sherwood was defeated by Democrat Chris Carney, a former Defense Department consultant and Navy lieutenant commander.

CQPolitics noted that "[a]t the outset of the 2006 midterm campaign cycle, it would have been difficult to identify a more politically 'safe' member than Pennsylvania Rep. Don Sherwood. A four-term Republican from the strongly conservative 10th District in northeastern Pennsylvania, Sherwood had run unchallenged by Democrats in 2002 and 2004." But, he "enters the general election campaign in a weakened position mostly because of his extramarital relationship with a young woman, to which he publicly admitted last year. Sherwood, though, adamantly denied the woman’s charges that he also physically abused her. A lawsuit brought by the woman against Sherwood was later settled."

On May 15, 2006, Sherwood survived a "surprisingly strong challenge" in the Republican primary from Kathy Scott, a political newcomer. Sherwood received 56% of the vote. CQPolitics reported that his "mediocre showing" could be attributed to the admitted affair. Scott did not file a report with the FEC, which indicates that she spent less than $5,000 in her campaign. His small margin of victory came despite the fact that, prior to the primary, Pennsylvania Senator Rick Santorum endorsed Sherwood and recorded an automated telephone call on Sherwood's behalf, as did President George W. Bush.

Sherwood's continuing problems resulting from the extramarital affair and Carney's nationally famous ads about it (in which actual residents of the district accuse Sherwood of having "no family values"), as well as polls that showed him 7 to 9 points behind, compelled Sherwood to respond with a television ad in which he directly apologized to voters for the affair, denied the allegations of physical abuse, and promised to continue what he said was his effective representation of the district if the voters were to forgive and re-elect him. However, the initial 2005 news about Sherwood admitting to an affair and being accused of choking the woman as well as the well-recognized Carney ads, which were described by the Associated Press as "hard-hitting", stuck with Sherwood's name throughout the campaign. Fallout for Sherwood continued, including charges that he voted against an increase in the minimum wage while hiking his own congressional income, a claim which the Congressman denounced as "bullshit", and for voting for the Central American Free Trade Agreement, which Carney said "sent Pennsylvanian jobs overseas." Sherwood fought back by labeling Carney a "liar" for the minimum wage charges and subsequently accused Carney of being a "liberal" for supposedly supporting tax increases. Carney shot back, accusing Sherwood of supporting tax cuts for the wealthy, while depriving the middle-class. Carol Sherwood, the Congressman's wife, wrote a letter to registered Republicans in the 10th District in which she lambasted Carney as someone who "gets some pleasure out of hurting our family" and stated that "I am certainly not condoning the mistake Don made, but I am not going to dwell on either." Simultaneously, President Bush made a visit to the area in October to Keystone College in La Plume Township, Pennsylvania to endorse Sherwood's run, a move which many believe might have hurt Sherwood when given Bush's declining popularity both nationwide and in the district. Bush supported Sherwood as "the right man to represent this district", to which the President drew uncertain applause from the audience, which included several empty tables. Coincidentally, Bush had deemed the week that he flew to Pennsylvania to help Sherwood as "National Character Counts Week", which propelled Carney to blast Bush as a hypocrite, stating he could not comprehend how President Bush could both endorse moral values and campaign for the affair-laden Sherwood in the same week. Simultaneously, Sherwood's campaign took a boost from a local newspaper, Times Leader, which ran a front-page headline in late October in which it accused Carney of "misrepresenting" quotes that were included in a Times Leader editorial page about Sherwood's extramarital affair. Meanwhile, Carney took pages from the Republican playbook by using the same tactics the GOP uses against Democrats to attack Sherwood, accusing the Congressman of having a "pre-9/11 mentality" on port security and of supporting amnesty for illegal immigrants, referring to President Bush's guest worker program for illegal immigration. Despite endorsements from Vice President Cheney, President Bush, and U.S. Senator Rick Santorum, Sherwood's campaign was surprisingly beaten in the financial spending wars by the Carney campaign. In the closing days of the campaign, last-minute news about new developments in a 2005 $500,000 deal with Sherwood's former mistress and accuser helped boost Carney, who had consistently played the trump card of "honor", "integrity", and "family values" in his campaign. Many voters also resonated with Carney's vague yet inspiring vow "to make Pennsylvania proud", a slogan that became very familiar to the 10th District, as well as his impressive record as a senior terrorism advisor in the Pentagon and his Navy service.

11th Congressional district

12th Congressional district

13th Congressional district

14th Congressional district

15th Congressional district

16th Congressional district

17th Congressional district

18th Congressional district

19th Congressional district

See also
 United States congressional delegations from Pennsylvania
 108th United States Congress

References

2006 Pennsylvania elections
2006
Pennsylvania